General Arthur Percy Upton CB (13 June 1777 – 22 January 1855) was an Anglo-Irish soldier, politician and amateur cricketer.

Background
Upton was the third son of Clotworthy Upton, 1st Baron Templetown, by Elizabeth Boughton, daughter of Shuckburgh Boughton. John Upton, 1st Viscount Templetown, and the Honourable Fulke Howard were his brothers. He was educated at Westminster School and attended the Royal Military Academy in Berlin.

Military career
He entered the British army in 1793 as an ensign in the Coldstream Guards and thereafter rose through the ranks as a lieutenant and captain in 1795, aide-de-camp to Sir Ralph Abercromby in 1799, major in the 13th Foot in 1807, lieutenant-colonel in the 7th West Indian regiment and the Grenadier Guards in  1807, brevet colonel in 1814, major-general in 1821, lieutenant-general in 1837 and full general on 11 November 1851.  He was awarded CB on 4 June 1815.

He was Equerry to the Queen in 1810, aide-de-camp to the Duke of York in 1815 and equerry to the Duchess of Kent by 1835.

Cricket career
Upton was an early member of Marylebone Cricket Club (MCC) who played several matches for its team. He played for the Gentlemen in the inaugural and second Gentlemen v Players matches in 1806. He took six catches in the first match, which the Gentlemen with given men won by an innings.

Upton's career spanned the 1795 to 1808 seasons. He is known to have made 47 appearances in high-level matches. He was a useful batsman and a good fielder but seems to have bowled only rarely.

Political career 
Upton was a Member of Parliament (MP) for Bury St Edmunds from 1818 to 1826.

He died unmarried in 1855.

References

Further reading
 Arthur Haygarth, Scores & Biographies, Volume 1 (1744-1826), Lillywhite, 1862

External links
CricketArchive record of Arthur Upton

1777 births
1855 deaths
People educated at Westminster School, London
British Army generals
English cricketers
English cricketers of 1787 to 1825
Gentlemen cricketers
Marylebone Cricket Club cricketers
Members of the Parliament of the United Kingdom for English constituencies
UK MPs 1818–1820
UK MPs 1820–1826
Younger sons of barons
Companions of the Order of the Bath
Recipients of the Military Order of Max Joseph
T. Mellish's XI cricketers
Marylebone Cricket Club and Homerton cricketers
Irish cricketers